Tell No Tales is the third studio album by the Norwegian hard rock band TNT. It was the best-selling TNT album in the U.S., according to their bass guitarist Morty Black. This album diverted from the power metal style of Knights of the New Thunder into a more glam metal direction.
Rock Candy Records reissused a remastered CD of the album in February 2022

Track listing

Personnel

Band 
Tony Harnell – vocals
Ronni Le Tekrø – guitars, guitar synthesizer
Morty Black – bass guitar, pedal synthesizer
Diesel Dahl – drums, percussion

Additional personnel
Håkon Iversen – background vocals
Bård Svendsen – keyboards and programming
Bjørn Nessjø – keyboards and programming
Carlos Waadeland – keyboards and programming

Charts

Album

Singles

Certification

Album credits 
Bjørn Nessjø – producer
Rune Nordahl – engineer
Mario Rodriguez – engineer
Bob Ludwig – mastering
Mark Weiss – photography
Jackie Murphy – cover design
Koppel & Scher – cover design Tom Schwab-Bits and pieces. Dale Matson-Bits and pieces.

References

External links 
Ronni Le Tekrø Official Website

1987 albums
TNT (Norwegian band) albums